Pangaro is an Italian surname. Notable people with the surname include:

Roberto Pangaro (born 1950), Italian freestyle swimmer
Tristano Pangaro (1922–2004), Italian football player

Italian-language surnames